LaMar's Donuts and Coffee is a restaurant chain that makes donuts and coffee. It was founded in Kansas City, Missouri, with headquarters in Denver, Colorado. LaMar's has 25 stores in five states: Arizona, Colorado, Kansas, Missouri, and Nebraska. LaMar's Donuts has won newspaper readers' poll awards for best doughnuts in several cities.

History
In 1960, founder Ray LaMar opened a donut shop in midtown Kansas City, in a converted gas station on Linwood Boulevard. The business was successful, and by 1990, LaMar and his wife decided to franchise the business. It was moved from the old gas station to a building one block over from the original. The newly relocated shop was open before May 2005. The business has since relocated and is currently headquartered in Denver, Colorado.

Products 
LaMar's offers over 100 varieties of donuts, including Ray's Original Glazed Donuts, cake donuts, donut holes, and specialties including LaMar's Bars, Bizmarks, and sour cream donuts.

LaMar's roasts their coffee beans in Denver, then ships them to their stores. Their coffee drinks include cappuccinos, lattes, and iced espresso-based beverages, as well as blended espresso-based drinks. LaMar's Donuts also offers a line of blended fruit smoothies called LaFrappés.

Media recognition 
The donuts made by LaMar's have been heralded as “simply the best” by numerous national media sources including NBC's Jay Leno, The New Yorker, Food Network, and the Zagat Survey. Jay Leno dubbed Ray the "King of Donuts." They are also included on several awards lists, including:

 Best of KC by 435 Magazine and Pitch Magazine in 2014
 Colorado's Best Food and Beverage Brand by Yahoo News in 2014
 Best of Omaha in 2016 by Omaha Magazine
 Feast Magazine's best donut shop in 2016
 Best Restaurant in Kansas and Denver in 2016 by Zomato.com
 Travel Channel's Best of Missouri in 2017

For National Donut Day in 2017, they became the first donut store to deliver donuts via air drone, making drops around Denver to the mayor, police, firefighters, and community members. This event generated media placements both locally and nationally, including features in four Denver TV stations, Denver Business Journal, Huffington Post, ABC News, and Mashable.

Partnerships 
LaMar's Donuts has participated in events such as the annual Whiskey and the Donuts Festival in Denver. LaMar's Donuts works with local police officers to sponsor events on National Coffee with a Cop Day.

LaMar's has frequently partnered with The Salvation Army since 2009 to donate proceeds from the week of National Donut Day to the organization's youth services. They also celebrate this event by educating the community about The Salvation Army's programs and how people can help or contribute to their cause.

See also
List of doughnut shops

References 
 

Companies based in Denver
Bakeries of the United States
Doughnut shops in the United States
1960 establishments in Missouri